Mehrdad Afsharian Tarshiz (born 31 October 1954) is an Iranian former cyclist. He competed in two events at the 1992 Summer Olympics.

References

External links
 

1954 births
Living people
Iranian male cyclists
Olympic cyclists of Iran
Cyclists at the 1992 Summer Olympics
Place of birth missing (living people)
Asian Games medalists in cycling
Asian Games bronze medalists for Iran
Cyclists at the 1982 Asian Games
Cyclists at the 1986 Asian Games
Medalists at the 1982 Asian Games
Medalists at the 1986 Asian Games
20th-century Iranian people